This article lists events that occurred during 1952 in Estonia.

Incumbents
First Secretary of the Communist Party of Estonia - Johannes Käbin

Events
Tallinn Pedagogical Institute was established.
until 1953 – Estonian SSR is reorganized into three oblasts: Tallinn, Tartu, and Pärnu.

Births
19 March – Joel Luhamets, clergyman
19 September – Rein Aedma, actor

Deaths

References

 
1950s in Estonia
Estonia
Estonia
Years of the 20th century in Estonia